Zdole is a settlement in the Municipality of Krško in eastern Slovenia. The area is part of the traditional region of Styria. It is now included with the rest of the municipality in the Lower Sava Statistical Region.

The parish church in the centre of the village is dedicated to Saint George and belongs to the Roman Catholic Diocese of Celje. It was built in 17th century and rebuilt in 1875 in a Neo-Romanesque style.

References

External links
Zdole on Geopedia

Populated places in the Municipality of Krško